Penny Pot is an unincorporated community within the borough of Folsom in Atlantic County, New Jersey, United States.

History
English settlers arrived in 1686 and named the settlement "Penny Pot" because it resembled the English countryside. The Hospitality Branch flows into the Great Egg Harbor River at Penny Pot, and a dam was built made of timbers salvaged from the hull of a British ship pirated during the Revolutionary War. The settlement was a group of houses around a tavern of the same name, and was described in 1915 as, "a settlement of other years, one large house remaining".

References

Folsom, New Jersey
Unincorporated communities in Atlantic County, New Jersey
Unincorporated communities in New Jersey